Đoković (also transliterated Djokovic or Djokovich) is a Serbian surname, derived from the male given name Đoka (Ђока)/Đoko (Ђоко)", itself a diminutive of the name Đorđe (Ђорђе; George in English). It may refer to:

 Novak Djokovic (born 1987), Serbian tennis player
 Srdjan Djokovic (born 1961) Novak's father
 Bob Djokovich (born 1956), American handballer
 Aleksandar Đoković (born 1991), Serbian footballer 
 Damjan Đoković (born 1990), Croatian footballer
 Ilija Đoković (born 1996), Serbian basketball player
 Ivan Đoković (born 1982), Serbian footballer
 Hasim Đoković (born 1974), Montenegrin footballer
 Marko Đoković (born 1991), Serbian tennis player, brother of Novak
 Olga Đoković  (born 1945), Yugoslavian basketball player
 Đorđe Đoković (born 1995), Serbian tennis player, brother of Novak
 Radovan Đoković (born 1996), Serbian basketball player
 Veselin Đoković (born 1976), Serbian footballer
 Jasna Đoković (born 1991), Montenegrin professional football player

See also
 Đokić
 Joković

Serbian surnames
Montenegrin surnames